Sciota insignella is a species of snout moth in the genus Sciota. It was described by Josef Johann Mann in 1862. It is found in Romania, Bulgaria, Turkey and Croatia.

References

External links
Lepiforum e. V.

Moths described in 1862
Phycitini
Moths of Europe
Moths of Asia